The South African Reserve Bank (SARB) is the central bank of South Africa. It was established in 1921 after Parliament passed an act, the "Currency and Bank Act of 10 August 1920", as a direct result of the abnormal monetary and financial conditions which World War I had brought. The SARB was only the fourth central bank established outside the United Kingdom and Europe, the others being the United States, Japan and Java. The earliest suggestions for the establishment of the Central Bank in South Africa date back to 1879. A select committee, of ten members of Parliament, was established on 31 March 1920 to examine the benefits to the national interest of the establishing of the central bank.

Following on the recommendations of the committee, the South African Reserve Bank opened for business on 30 June 1921, making it the oldest central bank in Africa. The first banknotes were issued to the public by the Bank on 19 April 1922. Set of ZAR notes 2012 to present R 104 000 000 000.00 and Set of ZAR notes 2018 to present 400 000 000 print.

Unlike the Bank of England, which provided the model for establishing the SARB, the SARB is privately owned.

Functions of the South African Reserve Bank

 Formulating and implementing monetary policy;
 Issuing banknotes and coin;
 Supervising the banking system;
 Ensuring the effective functioning of the national payment system (NPS);
 Managing official gold and foreign-exchange reserves;
 Acting as banker to the government – but not owned by South African Government. 
 Administering the country's remaining exchange controls; and
 Acting as lender of last resort in exceptional circumstances.

Organisational structure

Board of directors
SARB has a board of directors consisting of a Governor Lesetja Kganyago three Deputy Governors, and eleven Directors. The Governor, and Deputy governors are appointed for five-year terms by the President of South Africa in consultation with the Minister of Finance. Four of the directors are also appointed by the President for terms of three years. The remaining seven directors are appointed by the Shareholders of the Bank, also for a three-year term.

Ownership
The Reserve Bank, with 2 million issued shares, is one of eight reserve banks worldwide that have shareholders other than the governments of their respective countries (the others being Belgium, Greece, Italy, Japan, Switzerland, Turkey and the USA). The only limitation on shareholding is that no single shareholder may own more than 10,000 shares individually. Currently there are 696 shareholders, as of the shareholders index report of 31 August 2018, owning shares in the South African Reserve Bank.

Shareholders are entitled a dividend of not more than 10 South African cents per share per annum (the total maximum dividend is therefore 200,000 South African Rand or a maximum of 1,000 South African Rand for any individual shareholder), with the remaining profits being paid to the South African government.

The South African government has announced that it plans to nationalise the Reserve Bank.

List of governors of the South African Reserve Bank
William Henry Clegg – December 1920 – December 1931
Johannes Postmus – January 1932 – June 1945
Michiel Hendrik de Kock – July 1945 – June 1962
Gerhard Rissik – July 1962 – June 1967
Theunis Willem de Jongh – July 1967 – December 1980
Gerhard de Kock – January 1981 – August 1989
Chris Stals – August 1989 – August 1999
Tito Mboweni – August 1999 – November 2009
Gill Marcus – November 2009 – November 2014
Lesetja Kganyago – November 2014–

See also

 South African pound
 South African rand
 BankservAfrica
 List of central banks of Africa
 List of central banks

References

External links

Banks of South Africa
Central banks
1921 establishments in South Africa
Banks established in 1921
Financial regulatory authorities of South Africa